Forest Presbyterian Church is a historic Presbyterian church located at Lyons Falls in Lewis County, New York. It was built in 1894 and is a one-story, brown stained, eclectic, pitched roof building with a front-facing gable, a unique square bell tower with flared eaves, and a porte cochere. The church is in the Shingle Style with Gothic elements.  Also on the property is the two story, American Foursquare manse, dated to 1902, and a 19th-century barn.

It was listed on the National Register of Historic Places in 2004.

References

Churches on the National Register of Historic Places in New York (state)
Presbyterian churches in New York (state)
Gothic Revival church buildings in New York (state)
Churches completed in 1894
19th-century Presbyterian church buildings in the United States
Shingle Style church buildings
Churches in Lewis County, New York
National Register of Historic Places in Lewis County, New York
Shingle Style architecture in New York (state)